Orbellia petersoni is a species of fly in the family Heleomyzidae.

References

Heleomyzidae
Articles created by Qbugbot
Insects described in 1916
Taxa named by John Russell Malloch